Aradi may refer to:
, a diocese in the early African church
False name assumed by János Bartl